The Ester Rachel and Ida Kaminska Jewish Theater is a state theatrical institution in Warsaw, the capital city of Poland. It was named after the Polish-Jewish actress Ester Rachel Kamińska, who was called the "mother of Yiddish theater," and her daughter, the Academy Award-nominated actress Ida Kaminska. Ida Kamińska directed the theater and acted in its productions from the time of its founding until 1968.

The State Jewish Theater was formed in 1950 from two theater troupes which performed in Wrocław and Łódź in 1945–50. The theatre worked in both cities over the next few years and gave guest performances across Poland. In 1955 it moved to Warsaw permanently. Since 1970 it has performed in its own building on Grzybowski Square.

Since its inception, the theater has sought to continue the rich traditions of prewar Jewish theatrical stages in Poland. Plays at the theater are shown in Polish and Yiddish (headphones with Polish translation are available).

The theater cultivates the creativity of great Jewish drama. Its repertoire features the best works by Abraham Goldfaden, Mendele-Moykher Sforim, Sholom Aleichem, Isaac Leib Peretz and Jacob Gordin.

The president of the theatre was, in the years 1970 to 2014, an actor Szymon Szurmiej.

Listo of actors
 Rywa Buzgan, Noemi Jungbach, Ida Kamińska, Ruth Kamińska, Estera Kowalska, Alicja Miłoszewska, Ruth Kowalska, Halina Lercher, Danuta Morel, Czesława Rajfer, Zofia Rajfer, Stefania Staszewska, Lena Szurmiej, Etel Szyc, Gołda Tencer.
 Juliusz Berger, Mieczysław Bram, Chewel Buzgan, Seweryn Dalecki, Izaak Dogim, Piotr Erlich, Leon Garbarski, Karol Latowicz, Herman Lercher, Marian Melman, Abraham Morewski, Henryk Rajfer, Jack Recknitz, Józef Retik, Samuel Rettig, Abraham Rozenbaum, Jan Szurmiej, Dawid Obłożyński, Szymon Szurmiej, Michał Szwejlich, Zygmunt Turkow.

References

External links
 Official website of the Jewish State Theatre in Warsaw (in Polish)
 Jewish Theatre in Poland: Fragments of an Illustrious History

Jews and Judaism in Warsaw
Theatres in Warsaw
Yiddish culture in Poland
Yiddish theatre
Theatres completed in 1950
1950 establishments in Poland